Ocytata is a genus of flies in the family Tachinidae.

Species
O. pallipes (Fallén, 1820)

References

Exoristinae
Diptera of Europe
Taxa named by Johannes von Nepomuk Franz Xaver Gistel
Tachinidae genera